Trevon Grimes (born November 28, 1998) is an American football wide receiver who is a free agent. He played college football for the Florida Gators.

Early life and high school
Grimes grew up in Fort Lauderdale, Florida and attended St. Thomas Aquinas High School, where he played football and ran track. Over the course of his high school career he had 42 receptions for 770 yards and 11 touchdowns and was a two time state champion in the 300 meter hurdles.

College career
Grimes began his collegiate career at Ohio State. He played in two games as a freshman and caught three passes for 20 yards. He left the program in December and announced his intention to transfer, ultimately committing to Florida.

In his first year at Florida, Grimes caught 26 passes for 364 yards and two touchdowns. As a junior, Grimes had 33 catches for 491 yards and three touchdowns.

In his senior season, Grimes opted out of the 2020 Cotton Bowl Classic, in order to prepare for the 2021 NFL Draft.

Professional career

Grimes signed with the Philadelphia Eagles as an undrafted free agent on May 14, 2021. He was waived/injured on June 9, and reverted to the injured reserve list the next day. He was waived from injured reserve with an injury settlement on June 21, 2021.

References

External links
Florida Gators bio

Living people
American football wide receivers
Florida Gators football players
Players of American football from Fort Lauderdale, Florida
St. Thomas Aquinas High School (Florida) alumni
Ohio State Buckeyes football players
Philadelphia Eagles players
1998 births